Selimović is a surname. It may refer to:

Alma Selimovic (born 1981), artist and LGBT activist
Beba Selimović (1939-2020), Bosnian singer
Denis Selimović (born 1979), Slovenian footballer
Edin Selimović (born 1991), Serbian footballer
Envera Selimović, national of Bosnia and Herzegovina and United Nations Department of Public Information Representative in Azerbaijan
Himzo Selimović (born 1961), Bosnian politician and former policeman
Jasenko Selimović (born 1968), Bosnian-born Swedish theatre director
Meša Selimović (1910–1982), Yugoslav writer
Sabina Selimovic (1999-?), Austrian national which joined ISIS in 2014 and later disappeared
Šejla Selimović (1995), Bosnian footballer
Vahid Selimović, (born 1997), Serbian-Luxembourgian footballer

Bosnian surnames